Stanislav Igorevich Murikhin (born 21 January 1992) is a Russian former professional football player.

Club career
He made his Russian Premier League debut for FC Terek Grozny on 1 April 2012 in a game against FC Amkar Perm.

References

External links
 
 
 

1992 births
Footballers from Saint Petersburg
Living people
Russian footballers
Russian expatriate footballers
Expatriate footballers in Estonia
Expatriate footballers in Belarus
Russian Premier League players
FC Akhmat Grozny players
JK Sillamäe Kalev players
FC Volgar Astrakhan players
FC Belshina Bobruisk players
Meistriliiga players
Association football forwards
FC Zenit Saint Petersburg players
Russian expatriate sportspeople in Belarus
Russian expatriate sportspeople in Estonia